Davis Lakes is a group of lakes near the northern edge of Duchesne County, Utah, United States.

Description
 
Davis Lakes were named for Bob Davis, an early guide in the area and was the first to stock fish in the lakes.

See also

 List of lakes in Utah

References

Lakes of Utah
Lakes of Duchesne County, Utah
Features of the Uinta Mountains